The Ladang Jenun railway station is a Malaysian train station located at and named after the town of Ladang Jenun, Kedah. It closed and demolished in 2010 for giving way to the construction Ipoh–Padang Besar electrified and double-tracking project.

Defunct railway stations in Malaysia